The Federal Ministry of Petroleum Resources is a part of the Federal Ministries of Nigeria that directs petroleum resources and its activities in Nigeria. It is located at Block D, NNPC Towers, Herbert Macaulay way, CBD, Abuja.The President, Muhammadu Buhari is the current Minister and Mr. Timipre Sylva is the Minister of State.

History 

In the beginning, Petroleum matters were handled by the Hydrocarbon Section of the Ministry of Lagos Affairs, which reported directly to the Governor-general.

The Unit delivered responsibilities such as: keeping records on exploration matters, and importation of petroleum products; enforcing safety and other regulations on matters which were then mostly products importation and distribution, etc.

The Unit was upgraded to a Petroleum Division within the Ministry of Mines and Power, with the expansion of the petroleum industry activities. In 1971, the Nigerian National Oil Corporation (NNOC) was created to handle direct commercial operational activities in the oil industry on behalf of the Federal Government. However, the Department of Petroleum Resources in the Federal Ministry of Mines and Power continued to exercise statutory supervision and control of the industry. In 1975, the department was upgraded to a ministry named, the Ministry of Petroleum and Energy which was later renamed the Ministry of Petroleum Resources. Then in 1985, the Ministry of Petroleum Resources was re-established.

Organizational structure
The Ministry of Petroleum Resources is a government organization whose operational framework is made up of the Minister who is a political appointee, the Permanent Secretary who is a career officer and the Chief Accounting Officer of the Ministry. The Permanent Secretary reports all the affairs of the Ministry to the Minister, while the Directors in the Ministry report to the Permanent Secretary. The Ministry has twelve Directorates, each headed by a Director, namely: Department of Human Resources Management, Department of Planning, Research and Statistics, Department of Press and public relations, Department of Finance and Accounts, Legal Department, Department of Procurement, Department of Gas, Department of oil services, reforms Co-ord, General services, internal audit, Department of Special Duties, etc.

Each of the Departments has various divisions and sections in a hierarchical/pyramid setting headed by deputy directors, and the assistant directors heading sub-sections/units. The Directors report directly to the Permanent Secretary, while the deputy directors report to the Directors and the assistant directors report to the deputy directors respectively. The Ministry of Petroleum Resources operational frame work operates in a hierarchical level from the top management cadre down to the middle/junior executive cadre.

Leadership and Directors

President Muhammadu Buhari as Minister of Petroleum Resources appointed Dr. Emmanuel Ibe Kachikwu as the Minister of State and Petroleum Resources in November 2015. He was replaced by Timipre Sylva who took over the Ministerial portfolio in August 2019.

The ministry has one permanent secretary, nine directors, two deputy directors and an assistant director heading their various departments.

Directors, role & and their Departments:

Mission
Ensure an enabling environment to improve the Oil and Gas value chain, driven by modern technology, industry, best practices, stakeholders' engagement and innovations in alternative energy.

Vision
To deliver a thriving Oil and Gas (Energy) Industry for Nigeria.

Functions

 Initiation and formulation of the board policies and programmes on the development of the Petroleum sector (Oil and Gas) in general; 
 All policies matters on the marketing of crude oil, natural gas, Petroleum products and their derivatives; 
 All concession policies in the oil and gas sub-sectors of the energy sector of the economy; 
 Formulation of policies to stimulate private industry investment and participation in the oil and gas sectors;
 Administration of government joint venture interests in the Petroleum sector in order to maximize fully economic benefits derivable from Nigeria's oil and gas resources and ensuring optimization of government interest in all oil and gas arrangements;
 Licensing of all Petroleum and gas operations and activities;
 Policy matters relating to research and development in Petroleum and Gas sectors of the Petroleum industry;
 Development of hydro-carbon industries including natural gas, processing, refineries and Petrochemical industries through public private partnership;
 Formulation of policies to ensure increase of natural oil and gas reserve base and Nigeria's increased technical productivity in accordance with appropriate planning and allocation of production quotas to producing companies in line with OPEC quota and maximization of revenue from oil and gas to the Nation;
 Coordination and supervision of all bilateral and multilateral relations affecting the energy (Oil and Gas) Sector; Overall supervision and coordination of the activities of the following parastatals and its subsidiaries:
 Nigeria National Petroleum Corporation (NNPC)
 Department of Petroleum Resources (DPR)
 Petroleum Technology Development Fund (PTDF)
 Petroleum Equalization Fund (PEF)
 Petroleum Training Institute (PTI)
 Petroleum Products Pricing Regulatory Agency (PPPRA)

Departments

Departments, Leadership & and their Functions:

Parastatals

 Nigeria National Petroleum Corporation
 Department of Petroleum Resources
 Petroleum Training Institute
Nigeria Nuclear Regulatory Authority
Petroleum Products Pricing Regulatory Agency 
Nigerian Content Development Monitoring Board
Petroleum Technology Development Fund
 Petroleum Equalisation Fund

P & ID case 
In 2010, the Nigeria's Federal Ministry of Petroleum Resources was said to sign a contract agreement on behalf of the Nigerian government at the time, headed by president Goodluck Ebele Jonathan for the construction and operation of a new gas processing facility with a foreign private firm Process and Industrial Development Limited known as P&ID, a company incorporated in the British Virgin Islands.
The contract with the federal government of Nigeria was to supply natural gas ("wet gas") at no cost to the firm's facility. For its part, the firm was to construct and operate the facility for an agreed period including processing of the gas to remove natural gas liquids that the firm as its payment whilst the lean gas will be returned to Nigeria at no cost making it suitable for use locally.
The ministry under the leadership of the then minister, Diezani Alison-Madueke oversaw the conclusion of the contract which later became soiled in controversies and litigation. Both the contract and the circumstances relating to its conclusion were unusual. For one, the contract was based on an unsolicited proposal presented to the Nigerian government by P&ID. No tender was conducted. Moreover, P&ID did not appear to have the experience in the gas sector that would be expected of a company responsible for a multibillion-dollar project—it was an offshore entity with "no assets, only a handful of employees, and was without a website or other presence".
A report by a Nigerian journalist, Reuben Abati detailed provides a review of the case thus; "The matter went before an Arbitration Tribunal, under the Rules of the Nigerian Arbitration and Conciliation Act 2004, with London, England as place of Arbitration. After affirming its jurisdiction in the matter, the Tribunal began its procedural hearing to determine whether or not there was any repudiatory breach of contract. At this point, there was an attempt by the Ministry of Petroleum to reach a settlement agreement with P&ID to the tune of $850 million, payable in installments. This was submitted for Presidential approval a week to President Jonathan’s departure from office. It would have amounted to tying the hands of the incoming government to grant the approval for the payment of that sum. Meanwhile, the Arbitration Tribunal had bifurcated the case and by July 2015, it affirmed that indeed Nigeria had failed to perform its obligations under the GSPA and then unanimously decided that P&ID was entitled to damages with interest. It took the new Nigerian government more than 4 months to respond. The excuse given for the delay, by Ms. Folakemi Adelore, witness for Nigeria, was that there had been a change of administration in Nigeria and that Ministers, including the Attorney General had only just been appointed. Nigeria asked for an extension of time to act on the outcome of the Arbitration Tribunal".

Petroleum industry bill 
Nigeria as an oil dependent nation has sought various ways of developing its oil and gas sector in line with global standards necessitating the need for stronger and efficient regulation of the sector to enhance perfect competition through the initiative to the proposed Petroleum Industry Bill. A local news source reports that "the bill was first sent to Nigeria's National Assembly in December 2008 by the then President Umaru Yar’Adua. A presidential committee set up in 2007 to look into the oil and gas sector came up with the idea of this bill, which aims to increase transparency at Nigerian National Petroleum Corporation (NNPC) and to increase Nigeria’s share of oil revenue. The Bill was never passed into law due to objections from the International oil companies (IOCs) and Nigerian National Petroleum Corporation (NNPC) over certain contents in its draft. In 2015, the then Minister of State for Petroleum Resources, Dr. Ibe Kachikwu said the PIB was to be amended to speed up its passage. Consequently, the Bill was broken into different parts, to address various aspects of the oil industry. In 2016, the Senate showed signs of readiness to begin deliberations on the bill, set to be moved for a second reading by the Chairman of Senate Committee on Petroleum (Upstream), Senator Omotayo Alasoadura. Ahead of the debate on the Bill, Senators from the Niger Delta area, who had moved for the suspension of the bill some months back, because they believed that the non-inclusion of the community demands in the first phase might aggravate the tension in the oil producing areas, concluded plans to meet to brainstorm on the resuscitation of the bill and ensure that the work on its passage moved faster. The plan to ensure that it was passed before the end of the legislative sitting, for 2016, never became a reality. Again in 2018, a version of the bill, the Petroleum Industry Governance Bill (PIGB), was passed by the 8th National Assembly, however, President Muhammadu Buhari refused to assent it.

The New PIB 2020 
Despite failed attempts by the previous assemblies, the passage of the Petroleum Industry Bill is one of the priorities listed by the ninth National Assembly in its legislative agenda. Members of the Senate and the House of Representatives, resuming work after their inauguration on 11 June 2019, pledged to break the ”jinx" around the Petroleum Industry Bill (PIB) and bring about reforms in the oil sector. President of the Senate, Dr Ahmed Lawan and his counterpart in the House of Representatives, Hon. Femi Gbajabiamila had at different fora assured that the 9th National Assembly would pass the Bill. President Muhammadu Buhari on 29 September 2020 transmitted the new PIB to the legislators. The Bill passed through first and second reading without varying views from the lawmakers, and consequently an ad-hoc committee was set up by the House for the public hearings, while the Senate committees on petroleum upstream, downstream and gas handled that of the Senate.
The new PIB titled: "A Bill for an Act to Provide Legal, Governance, Regulatory and Fiìscal Framework for the Nigerian Petroleum Industry, the Development of Host Community and for Related Matters", amongst others seeks to scrap the Petroleum Equalisation Fund (PEF) and Petroleum Products Pricing Regulatory Agency (PPPRA) and replace them with a new agency to be known as Nigerian Midstream and Downstream Regulatory Authority (NMDRA) which shall be responsible for the technical and commercial regulation of midstream and upstream petroleum operations in the industry. The Bill proposes the establishment of Nigerian Upstream Regulatory Commission to be responsible for the technical and commercial regulation of upstream petroleum operations. It further seeks the commercialisation of the Nigerian National Petroleum Corporation (NNPC) to become Nigerian National Petroleum Company to be incorporated under the Companies and Allied Matters Act by the Minister of petroleum.

Stakeholders Oppose Some Provisions in the Bill at the Public Hearings 
Both chambers of the national assembly held a two-day public hearing on the Bill to enable stakeholders make their inputs before its final passage. While the Senate held theirs on 25–26 January, the House on its part conducted theirs on 27–28 January. At the hearing organised by the Senate Joint Committee on Petroleum Upstream, Downstream and Gas, some major oil producing companies and other stakeholders in the industry raised concerns over some provisions of the new Bill. The Chairman of the Oil Producing Trade Section (OPTS), Mike Sangster who made his presentations on behalf of Total, Chevron, Exxon Mobil and Shell companies expressed dissatisfaction with some provisions of the bill. Major concerns they raised included deepwater developments, which he said have contributed significantly in maintaining Nigeria's oil production levels by offsetting the decline in the Joint Venture production. The group complained that the PIB shows that the Deepwater provisions do not provide a favourable environment for future investments and for the launching of new projects. They also proposed that PIB should remove Hydrocarbon Tax considering that companies will still be subject to CIT. The group said to ensure investors are encouraged to finance Deepwater projects, the PIB should grant Deepwater oil projects a full royalty relief during the first five years of production or a graduated royalty scheme as detailed in their submission. They further said the bill does not address the key challenges facing gas development in Nigeria, such as inadequate midstream infrastructure, regulated gas pricing, huge and long outstanding debts, etc., thereby potentially jeopardising the realisation of government's aspirations for the domestic gas sector. They suggested that PIB provide a clear path for transitioning to free market-based pricing, not add additional compliance conditions on domestic gas delivery obligations as a precondition for export gas supply and allow pre-existing contracts and agreements to run their course. Also, HOSTCOM National President, Mr. Benjamin Style Tams, in his presentation, said it will be absurd and economically illogical to deprive "HostCom" the right to equity shareholding in both the establishment of the NNPC Limited, the commission, the authority and the boards. It said: "This quest to take over complete control of all our national assets by a very unpatriotic few has to stop. In the case of the gas flare penalty funds, the host communities, which are the direct recipients of the negative effects, are the ones to receive the gas flare penalty. "Regarding the environmental management and sustainable development of the host communities, it’s imperative that all laws and policies precedent to the commencement of any action must conform with the existing international standards inherent in our submission".
In another presentation, Women in Energy Network (WIEN) also raised concern over the proposal in the PIB, which stated that "each settler, where applicable through the operator, should contribute an amount equal to 2.5 per cent of actual operating expenditure in respect of all petroleum operation". President of WIEN and managing director of Zigma Limited, Mrs. Funmi Ogbue, said the 2.5 per cent is too expensive. They cited Sections 3, 14, 15, 18, 22, 26, 37, 41 and 71, among others as they asked the lawmakers to change words like 'he', 'his' and 'him' to 'they', 'their', and 'them'. At the hearing in the House of Representatives, stakeholders including oil producers, oil producing states, organised labour and various interests groups opposed some provisions in the law which they argued are not favorable for competition, investments and other activities in the petroleum industry. In his own submission, President of the Nigerian Labour Congress, (NLC) Comrade Ayuba Wabba countered some provisions of the PIB and proposed amendment to involve the labour and enhance productivity in the oil sector. According to him: "Section 53 that creates Nigerian National Petroleum Company Limited assumes that it should exist simultaneously with NNPC as a corporation. This presages an inherent tendency for confusion between the two entities. Hence, it is necessary to clarify the two entities. In sum, the operating arm or the holding company could benefit from the avoidance of the confusion of nomenclature. "Section 53 (1) provides that the Minister shall within six months from the commencement of this Act, cause to be incorporated under the Companies and Allied Matters Act, a limited liability company, which shall be called Nigerian National Petroleum Company Limited (NNPC Limited).
"Labour disagrees with this provision. There is ample grounds for worry in this provision. Indeed, incorporation under CAMA of NNPC Ltd has potential implications for adverse business maneuvers, including winding up of the incorporated company by a petition. Therefore, creditors, hostile take over bids and even minority shareholders could scheme the extant rules to the disadvantage of the Nigerian people. "We suggest that NNPC Ltd. should be incorporated in a more robust manner that would enable it to operate with minimum hindrance, free of potentially hostile encumbrances and be profitably managed. This robustness in the establishment of NNPC Ltd. should at least, ensure that no individual, a select few or hostile corporate bodies can disrupt its operations through petitions and take over maneuvers".
In its submission, National Union of Petroleum and National Gas, (NUPENG) and Petroleum and Natural Gas Senior Staff Association of Nigeria, (PENGASSAN) pushed for an Oil and Gas Regulatory Commission. Presenting their joint position, the President of PENGASSAN, Festus Osifo argued that it would be counterproductive to duplicate commissions. He also urged for independent regulator of NNPC asking the lawmakers to ensure that the PIB when passed must attract investments. The public hearing however took a different turn on Day Two. Before the commencement, members of the host communities engaged in a physical altercation. The fight broke out when the Host Communities of Nigeria Producing Oil and Gas (HOSTCOM) was called to the podium to make presentation by the Chairman of the Ad-hoc Committee on PIB, Hon. Mohammed Monguno, but there was disagreement amongst them leading to exchange of blows until security operatives intervened. To this end, lawmakers and other participants scampered for safety, and reconvened after the dust settled. One of the men involved in the fight, who identified himself, as High Chief Benjamin Tamaranebi, and President of HOSTCOM, speaking to journalists later said the fight was all about the demand for 10 percent equity shares by the host communities. It will be recalled that the government had in the PIB proposed 2.5. percent as royalty for the host communities. But Tamaranebi said it was not enough for the people and therefore demanded upward increase of 10 percent. Also speaking on the development, Barr. Gouha Ukhorumah who represented the Offshore Gbaramatu and coastal Host Communities in Warri South Local Government of Delta State said the quarrel was basically between two factions of the a group who referred to themselves as Host Communities without a specific kingdom or Local government as area of coverage.

Position of State Governments 
Similarly, in their various presentations, some oil producing states such as Delta, Rivers, Bayelsa, Akwa Ibom pushed for inclusion into the boards of the various regulatory commissions. Rivers State recommended that in view of the strategic position of Rivers State in the oil and gas production scale/contribution, the headquarters of the commission and all oil producing companies should be cited in Rivers State in line with presidential directives. For Delta State, Section 238 of the bill which read "Failure to incorporate Petroleum Host Communities Development Trust", should be redrafted to read "Failure by any holder of a license or lease governed by this act to comply with its obligation under this chapter may be grounds for revocation of the applicable license or lease". The State represented by the Chief Economic Adviser to Governor Ifeanyi Okowa, Dr. Kingsley Emu also asked that section 238 of the bill be redrafted to read: "Section 238 ‘ failure by any holder of a license or lease governed by the act to incorporate the petroleum host communities development trust within the time frame in section 236 shall make the holder or license to be liable to a penalty of $250, 000 to be paid to the trust whenever the trust fund is incorporated. In addition, a further of $50,000 for every subsequent month the trust remains un- incorporated. This penalty shall be in addition to the amount due to the trust fund under section 240". The government also asked the lawmakers to create a new section 240 (5) to create 50 percent of the penalties for gas flared in the particular license or lease area for which the petroleum Host Community Development Trust is established just as it also asked for the creation of a new Section 240(6) to read
"A take off grant equivalent of 20 percent of the licence fee paid on a new licence or sales price where the lease or licence is resold".

Rejecting the PIB Again 
After the altercation on the final day of the hearing at the House, coalition of Civil Society Organizations (CSOs) and oil-producing communities in the Niger Delta rejected the Petroleum Industry Bill, 2020. Speaking, the spokesperson of the CSOs and host communities in the Niger Delta, Botti Isaac accused the House of Representatives ad-hoc Committee on PIB of ignoring the interest of host communities. He also accused the National Assembly of not allowing a fair and adequate opportunity for vulnerable stakeholders in the region to have a say in the legislative processes towards passing the PIB, as both chambers denied their members access to the public hearing hall. He opined that the manner the House handled the host communities and civil society contributions in the hearings was deliberately aimed at ensuring critical voices are not heard. He said the current PIB will not protect the host communities as it leaves them at the mercies of the oil companies. Isaac also said the bill when passed and signed into law will promote confusion in the Niger Delta and further expose the communities to environmental degradation and untold hardship, and that communities in the Niger Delta will not accept such a law. He argued that placing the protection of oil installations on some unarmed host communities is unrealistic as "previous researches conducted by Social Action reveals that oil theft which is the major reason for puncturing oil pipelines is carried out mainly by armed cartels who are most times not even members of the community".

Federal government's position 
Meanwhile, making its presentation at the hearing, the chairman, Revenue Mobilization, Allocation and Fiscal Commission (RMAFC) Elias Mbam told the lawmakers that the bill may cut the flow of revenue to the Federal Government. He said, "The Commission supports fully the aims and objectives of this Bill. However, there are some areas we contend strongly. The Bill did not make reasonable provision on inflow of revenue to the federation. If we have NNPC Limited that is talking about dividends which may come once a year, how do we guarantee a continuous infow of revenue monthly into the Federation Account?
"Secondly, we are aware that all revenue from Hydrocarbons is a revenue item of the Federation Account but where taxes are deducted from Hydrocarbon revenue, it is the same thing as encroaching on the Federation Account. So we expect that the Bill should not be to the disadvantage of monthly revenue to the Federation Account.
"On the host community funds, the Commission is totally in support of the establishment of community funds. Our concern is the source of the fund. There is subsisting law which has provided 13% to address issues that are related to community funding. We feel that source of fund should be from that 13%.”

Stakeholders who support the bill 
Despite the rejection by host communities and other players in the industry, some stakeholders in the oil and gas sector of the Nigerian economy at the hearing took turns to highlight the significant good inherent in the proposed Petroleum Industry Bill. The stakeholders which includes the Minister of State for Petroleum Resources, Chief Timipre Silva, the Group Managing Director, GMD, of the Nigerian National Petroleum Corporation, NNPC, Mele Kyari and the Chairman of the Federal Inland Revenue Service, FIRS, Mohammed Nami said that bill when promulgated into law would promote economic growth and bring about the needed vigour and transparency that would in turn engender productivity in the petroleum industry.

National Assembly Still Optimistic on Bill’s Passage 
President of the Senate, Ahmad Lawan and the Speaker of the House, Hon. Femi Gbajabiamila in their separate remarks at the public hearings held in both chambers, assured that the passage and assent to the PIB would take place before the end of May, 2021. While declaring the public hearing open at the Senate, Lawan warned against further delay in the passage of the Petroleum Industry Bill (PIB) as it will result in more colossal losses to the Nigerian economy. According to him, ”The National Assembly will pass the bill by April and I’m sure it will get presidential assent by May, this year. The Ninth Senate in its wisdom, made the passage of the bill a priority in its legislative agenda and has since in conjunction with critical stakeholders been working assiduously to get the bill passed this year. ”Arguably, Nigeria’s oil and gas industry has experienced several shocks and challenges over a long period as a result of outdated laws. These challenges include those dictated by global practices, the persistent calls for the deregulation of the downstream sector, the agitation of the oil-producing communities and the unbundling of the NNPC, all these, underscore the need for urgent legislative reform. ”It is a known fact that the non-passage of the PIB has been a major drag on the industry over the years, significantly limiting its ability to attract both local and foreign capital at a time when many other countries are scrambling to exploit their oil and gas resources. The mere knowledge that the nation’s oil industry is still being govern by laws enacted more than 50 years ago is ludicrous and extremely disappointing. ”As legislators, we will strive to deliver a Bill that will enhance the growth of our oil and gas industry, modernize our fiscal system and enhance competitiveness, while creating harmony for all stakeholders. This is a promise we have made and that we shall achieve. Nigeria must have an Oil and Gas Industry that benefits its people. Equally, our Oil and Gas Industry must be competitive. We must create a sustainable investment climate, where business in the sector will flourish".
Mr. Gbajabiamila, on his part, said despite the position of any vested interest, the House of Representatives will ensure that it protects the interest of Nigeria and Nigerians in the Bill. He said though it was a national consensus that there should be a comprehensive reform of the oil and gas industry, he bemoaned a situation where "this critical national industry underperforms its potential and our national expectations".
The Speaker said, ”we are not oblivious to the fact of many contending interests in this sector. These contentions do not need to result in conflict, especially when we know the objective of national prosperity benefits us all. Therefore, the process of engaging with stakeholders will continue beyond this public hearing to accommodate the diversity of interests and ensure all critical views form part of the deliberations that inform the final legislation. "This bill has been long coming as the chairman said. It has been upcoming in the last 20 years. Because of contending and vested interests, we have not been able to reach the desired outcome over the years. "A lot of work has gone into the preparation of this Bill, but it’s not strait-jacketed. The idea of a public hearing is to have interests that may have not been accommodated prior to the introduction of the Bill to lend their voices and to understand perhaps the bigger environment where they are coming from".

What next for PIB? 
Reconvening after the exchange of blows by the host communities at the house public hearing, the Chairman of the Ad-hoc Committee on PIB, Hon. Mohammed Monguno, assured that the panel would visit various Communities in the coast region to properly engage them. While condemning the scuffle which broke out between the host communities, the House Spokesman, Hon. Benjamin Kalu said the House remains on track to pass the PIB by April 2021, mindful that the legislation will reinvigorate the petroleum industry and promote economic growth in the host communities and the nation at large."

References 

Petroleum in Nigeria
Federal Ministries of Nigeria
Ministries established in 1970
Energy ministries